Chumeh Tupchi Masjid (also Romanized as Chūmeh Tūpchī Masjid; also known as Chūmeh Tūpchī and Tūpchī) is a village in Hoseyni Rural District, in the Central District of Shadegan County, Khuzestan Province, Iran. At the 2006 census, its population was 307, in 41 families.

References 

Populated places in Shadegan County